Ptychoglene coccinea is a moth in the subfamily Arctiinae. It was described by Henry Edwards in 1886. It is found in Arizona.

References

Moths described in 1886
Cisthenina